The 74th Writers Guild of America Awards were held on March 20, 2022, to honor the best writing in film, television and radio of 2021. The nominees for television and radio were announced on January 13, 2022, while the nominees for the film categories were announced on January 27, 2022.

Winners and nominees 
Winners are listed first and in bold.

Film

Television

Children's

Documentary

News

Radio

Promotional writing

References

External links 
 

2021
2021 film awards
2021 in American cinema
2021 in American television
2021 television awards
2021 awards in the United States
March 2022 events in the United States